Cheikh Gadiaga (born 30 November 1979) is a Senegalese football midfielder who  plays  for Gamma Ethniki club Asteras Amaliada F.C. in Greece. He was called up to the Senegal national team in 2001.

References

External links
 

1979 births
Living people
Association football midfielders
Senegalese footballers
Senegalese expatriate footballers
Senegal international footballers
Yanbian Funde F.C. players
R.W.D. Molenbeek players
Lierse S.K. players
R.A.E.C. Mons players
Hapoel Petah Tikva F.C. players
Alki Larnaca FC players
AEL Limassol players
Ermis Aradippou FC players
Ergotelis F.C. players
Panachaiki F.C. players
Belgian Pro League players
Football League (Greece) players
Cypriot First Division players
Israeli Premier League players
Expatriate footballers in Israel
Expatriate footballers in Cyprus
Expatriate footballers in China
Expatriate footballers in Greece
Senegalese expatriate sportspeople in Israel
Senegalese expatriate sportspeople in Cyprus
Senegalese expatriate sportspeople in China
Senegalese expatriate sportspeople in Greece